Prosoplus pauxillus is a species of beetle in the family Cerambycidae. It was described by Thomas Blackburn in 1901, originally under the genus Corrhenes. It is known from Australia.

References

Prosoplus
Beetles described in 1901
Taxa named by Thomas Blackburn (entomologist)